Feng Xiaoning (born 1954) is a Chinese film director, screenwriter and cinematographer. He is considered a member of the "Fifth Generation" Chinese directors who graduated from the Beijing Film Academy in 1982.  Feng however graduated from the Art Direction class.

He is currently also a member of Chinese National Political Consultative Conference and Chinese Writers' Association.

Feng was born in Xi'an to a family of teachers.  He is most famous for his self-dubbed "War and Peace" trilogy in film – Red River Valley (1997), Lovers' Grief over the Yellow River (1999) and Purple Sunset (2001).

External links
 

Film directors from Shaanxi
Living people
1954 births
Beijing Film Academy alumni
Artists from Xi'an
Screenwriters from Shaanxi
Chinese cinematographers
Writers from Xi'an